Fox Valley or Fox River Valley may refer to:

 Fox Valley (Illinois), centered on the Fox River of Northern Illinois, U.S.
 Fox Valley (Wisconsin), centered on the Fox River (Green Bay tributary), U.S.
 Fox Cities, cities, towns and villages along the Fox River
 Fox Valley, Saskatchewan, a village in Canada
 Rural Municipality of Fox Valley No. 171
 Fox Valley Mall, in Aurora, Illinois, U.S.

See also

 Fox River Valley Railroad, in eastern Wisconsin 1988–1993